Efrat Peled (born 1974, Israel) is the Chairman and CEO of Arison Investments and the CEO of SAFO (Shari Arison Family Office, Miami, USA).

Early life and career

Peled serves as Chairman and CEO of Arison Investments, and as CEO of SAFO (Shari Arison Family Office) in Miami, USA, responsible for managing all of Arison's businesses, estimated at billions of dollars. She also serves as an International Board Member of the Weizmann Institute. Peled is a former board member at Bank Hapoalim, Israel's leading bank, a former member of the board at Shikun & Binui, Israel's leading infrastructure and real estate company, a former member of the board at Salt of the Earth, Israel's leading salt producer,  a former member of the board at Miya, a global water efficiency company, a former member of the board at The Ted Arison Family Foundation. and a former member of the Advisory Committee to the Israeli government's National Economic Council.

Peled holds an Executive Masters of Business Administration from Kellogg-Recanati, a joint international program of both Northwestern and Tel Aviv Universities. She also holds a BA in Accounting and Economics from Tel Aviv University, a postgraduate diploma in Real Estate Appraisal and Management from Tel Aviv University, and is a Certified Public Accountant (CPA).

After becoming a qualified CPA, she specialized at KPMG Somekh Chaikin. In 2000, she was appointed CFO of Shargad Archonim–Movenpick, owned by Shari Arison. In 2001 she was appointed CFO of The Ted Arison Family Foundation, and since 2004, she also serves as CEO of SAFO (Shari Arison Family Office, Miami, USA). In March 2006, she was appointed CEO of Arison Investments, and in 2010 Chairman of the board at Arison Investments.

At Arison Investments, Peled manages a diversified global portfolio estimated at $6 billion, focused on long-term values-based investments that bring added value to people, economy, and the environment. Arison Investments, which she heads, is a global company operating across numerous countries with thousands of employees worldwide. Peled has fostered widespread connections with many international financial entities.

Awards and accolades
Forbes Israel repeatedly ranked Peled one of the Most Powerful Women in Israel. Listed No. 9 in 2015,  No. 8 in 2014, and No. 6 in 2013. Forbes Israel stated: "Peled quickly established herself as an exceptional and outstanding persona, both in the local business arena, and outside it."

Two years in a row she was ranked on Fortune's 50 Most Powerful Women in Business, No. 50 in 2012, and No. 44 in 2011, and was listed on Fortune's 10 Global Women on the Rise in 2011.

In 2012, Peled was honored Executive of the Year - Conglomerates by Stevie International Business Awards, and in 2013 she received the Northwestern University Alumni Merit Award, from Kellogg School of Management, honoring her for her outstanding professional and personal achievements in business. She was the first-ever Israeli honored this prestigious recognition, granted so far mostly to Americans.
 
Peled is a former member of the World Economic Forum. She is also a former member the Clinton Global Initiative LEAD group (since 2010), a flagship program that brings together a select group of twenty accomplished young leaders from around the globe, to develop innovative solutions for some of the world's most pressing challenges.

Interviews and articles
 World Economic Forum, May 2010 – "Emerging Market Multinationals: Building the New Fortune 500"
 BBC, February 2011 – "My Bottom Line"
 Fortune, September 2011 – "Ten Global Women on the Rise"
 World Economic Forum, January 2012 – "Overcoming Organizational Boundaries"
 Financial Times, February 2012 – "View from the C-Suite: Arison's Good Intentions"
 Algemeiner on Bonds NASDAQ Marketplace, March 2012 – "Corporate Sustainability: Doing Good is Good for Business"
 Fortune Most Power Women Summit, October 2012 – "Speakers"
 Huffington Post, October 2012 – "Take a Peek into a Bright Future"
 Northwestern, March 2013 – "Efrat Peled"
 Fortune Most Power Women Summit, October 2013 – "Emerging Markets: Golden Era Of Growth is Over"
 Triple Pundit, December 2013 – "Success in Emerging Markets Requires a Values-First Approach"
 Council on Foreign Relations, April 2014 – "Water Abundance Is Within Reach"
 Milken, April 2014 - "Collaboration 3.0: Partnering for More than Money"
 Big Think, April 2014 – "Efrat Peled", "Act Locally: Achieving Smart Sustainability"
 Ensia, October 2014 – "Efrat Peled: Good Business"
 Forbes, October 2014 – "Efrat Peled: How to Do Good Business"
 Forbes Israel, August 2014 - "8. אפרת פלד" 
 MarketWatch, May 2015 – "Efrat Peled is Panelist at the Milken Institute 2015 Global Conference"

References

External links
Efrat Peled Arison Investments Chairman And CEO 
Efrat Peled 

American women chief executives
American chief executives of financial services companies
Kellogg School of Management alumni
Tel Aviv University alumni
1974 births
Living people
Place of birth missing (living people)
21st-century American women